Leslie "Les" Jones (22 February 1910 – 11 January 1956) was an Australian rules footballer who played with Melbourne in the Victorian Football League (VFL).

Jones was a member of three premiership teams at East Fremantle, in 1928, 1929 and 1930. The Western Australian player came to Melbourne in 1933 and went on to appear in nine seasons with the club, mostly at half forward. He was on a half forward flank in their 1939 premiership team, contributing three goals in the grand final. The following year he became playing coach of Terang, but returned to Melbourne mid-season. He made one appearance in 1941, then enlisted in the Royal Australian Air Force.

References

1910 births
1956 deaths
Australian rules footballers from Western Australia
Melbourne Football Club players
East Fremantle Football Club players
Terang Football Club players
Terang Football Club coaches
Royal Australian Air Force personnel of World War II
People from Beverley, Western Australia
Melbourne Football Club Premiership players
One-time VFL/AFL Premiership players
Royal Australian Air Force airmen
Military personnel from Western Australia